Kapag Napagod ang Puso is a 1988 Filipino romantic drama film directed by Maryo J. de los Reyes and starring Christopher de Leon, Snooky Serna, Gloria Romero, Lito Pimentel, Julio Diaz, Rez Cortez, Anjo Yllana, Caridad Sanchez, and Gil de Leon. Produced by VH Films, it was released in June 1988.

The film received positive reviews from critics, with Lav Diaz praising its focus on the issue of domestic violence and Christopher de Leon's performance. It was nominated for nine FAMAS Awards, winning Best Actor for de Leon.

Cast
Christopher de Leon as Adrian
Snooky Serna as Rosalie
Gloria Romero
Lito Pimentel
Julio Diaz
Rez Cortez
Anjo Yllana
Caridad Sanchez
Gil de Leon

Release
Kapag Napagod ang Puso was graded "B" by the Movie and Television Review and Classification Board (MTRCB), indicating a "Good" quality, and was released in June 1988.

Critical response
Mario Hernando, a critic from the television program Movie Magazine, gave the film five out of five stars. Lav Diaz, writing for the Manila Standard, gave the film a positive review, praising its focus on the issue of domestic violence. He also gave high praise to de Leon's complex performance as Adrian, stating that the film was "another big step of Christopher de Leon [...] toward greatness in the art of acting."

Accolades

References

External links

1988 films
1988 romantic drama films
Filipino-language films
Films about domestic violence
Philippine romantic drama films
Films directed by Maryo J. de los Reyes